Thomas Joseph Flanagan (October 23, 1930 – October 9, 2019) was an Irish-born prelate of the Roman Catholic Church in the United States.  He served as an Auxiliary Bishop of the Diocese of San Antonio in Texas from 1998 to 2005.

Biography

Early life and education 
Thomas Flanagan was born on October 23, 1930, in Carbury, County Kildare, in the Republic of Ireland.  He was the oldest of eight children born to Patrick and Mary McNamara Flanagan. Flanagan attended St Conleth's National School in Carbury and then Mungret College, a high school near Limerick.  He  then studied at St. Patrick's College, Thurles in Ireland.  In 1956, on a visit to Ireland, Archbishop Robert E. Lucey recruited Flanagan to serve as a priest in Texas after his ordination.

Priesthood 
Flanagan was ordained into the priesthood on June 10, 1956, for the Diocese of San Antonio. After emigrating to the United States,Flanagan served in eight parishes in Texas.  He also served as spiritual advisor of the Saint Vincent de Paul Society, Chairman of the Board of the archdiocese's Assumption Seminary, and diocesan chapter chaplain for its Knights of Columbus. 

In 1969, Flanagan was appointed as administrator, then pastor, of St. Agnes Parish in Edna, Texas.  Flanagan was awarded a Master of Divinity degree from the Oblate School of Theology in San Antonio in 1979.  He was named a monsignor by Pope John Paul II on Nov. 29, 1989.

Auxiliary Bishop of San Antonio 
On January 5, 1998, Flanagan was appointed titular bishop for Bavagaliana and auxiliary bishop for the Archdiocese of San Antonio by Pope John Paul II. Flanagan was consecrated on February 16, 1998 at the Municipal Auditorium in San Antonio.  His principal consecrator was Archbishop Patrick Flores. with Bishop Edmond Carmody, and Bishop John McCarthy as co-consecrators.

Retirement 
Flanagan retired as auxiliary bishop of the Archdiocese of San Antonio on December 15, 2005, at age  75 and died in San Antonio on October 9, 2019.

See also
 

 Catholic Church hierarchy
 Catholic Church in the United States
 Historical list of the Catholic bishops of the United States
 List of Catholic bishops of the United States
 Lists of patriarchs, archbishops, and bishops

References

External links
 Roman Catholic Archdiocese of San Antonio Official Site

Episcopal succession

People from County Kildare
1930 births
2019 deaths
Irish emigrants to the United States
20th-century Roman Catholic bishops in the United States
21st-century Roman Catholic bishops in the United States
Alumni of St. Patrick's College, Thurles
Irish expatriate Catholic bishops